Sherry Lansing (born Sherry Lee Duhl; July 31, 1944) is an American philanthropist and retired film studio executive. She is the Chairwoman of the Universal Music Group, and was the CEO of Paramount Pictures and president of production at 20th Century Fox. In 1996, she became the first woman to be named Pioneer of the Year by the Foundation of the Motion Picture Pioneers. In 1999, she was appointed to the University of California Board of Regents.  In 2005, she became the first female movie studio head to place hand and foot prints at the Grauman's Chinese Theater.  In 2001, she was named one of the 30 most powerful women in America by Ladies' Home Journal, and The Hollywood Reporter named her fourth on its Power 100 list in 2003.

Early life
Lansing was born Sherry Lee Duhl in Chicago, Illinois, the only child of Margaret Heimann and real estate investor David Duhl. Her mother fled from Nazi Germany in 1937, at the age of 17. After her father died when Lansing was nine, her mother remarried to Norton S. Lansing. She was raised in a Jewish household. 

Lansing attended the University of Chicago Laboratory Schools and graduated in 1962. In 1966, she earned a Bachelor of Science degree at Northwestern University, where she was a member of Sigma Delta Tau sorority.

Career

Acting career 
A former mathematics teacher, Lansing briefly dabbed with acting, appearing in the films Loving and Rio Lobo (both 1970), as well as on several television shows. Dissatisfied with her own acting skills, she decided to learn more about the film industry from the ground up.

Career in production 
Lansing took a job with MGM as head script reader and worked on two successful films, The China Syndrome and Kramer vs. Kramer, both released in 1979. Her work at MGM eventually led, after a stint at Columbia Pictures, to an appointment with 20th Century Fox in 1980, at age 35, as the first female production president of a major studio. She resigned in December 1982 and became a partner with Stanley R. Jaffe to form Jaffe-Lansing Productions based at Paramount Pictures. The company released a consistent string of minor hits through Paramount before achieving box-office success with Fatal Attraction in 1987, for which Jaffe and Lansing received Academy Award nominations for Best Picture the following year.

The partnership produced The Accused (1988) starring Jodie Foster, about rape and its impact on a victim's life. The film featured a graphic rape scene and was highly controversial when released. Made with a small budget of $6 million, it grossed over $37 million worldwide, becoming a box office hit as well as receiving critical praise with Foster scoring the Academy Award for Best Actress.

Chairman of Paramount 
In 1992, she was offered the chairmanship of Paramount Pictures' Motion Picture Group. During her tenure at Paramount, the studio enjoyed its longest and most successful string of releases since the 1930s. Under Lansing, the studio produced such hits as Forrest Gump, Braveheart, and what was, at the time, history's highest-grossing film  – Titanic (the latter two with Fox). Six of the ten highest-grossing Paramount films were released during her tenure which included three Academy Awards for Best Picture.

As studio chief, she focused on bottom-line cost rather than market share, preferring to take fewer risks and make lower-budget films than other studios. Viacom (which purchased Paramount in 1994) decided to split the company into two parts in 2004 and Lansing stepped down at the end of that year after an almost unprecedented twelve-year tenure atop Hollywood's legendary "Best Show in Town."

She is a Regent of the University of California. She sits on the boards of the American Red Cross, The Carter Center, DonorsChoose, Qualcomm, Teach for America, The American Association for Cancer Research, the Lasker Foundation and Friends of Cancer Research. She is a founding advisory board member of Women's Image Network which since 1993 has produced the Women's Image Network Awards, which promotes gender parity and is also known as The WIN Awards.

Chairman of Universal Music Group 
Lansing named the Chairman of Board of Directors of the Universal Music Group in 2023.

Philanthropic career 
In 2005, she created the Sherry Lansing Foundation, which is dedicated to raising awareness and funds for cancer research. She is a recipient of UCLA Anderson School of Management's highest honor-the Exemplary Leadership in Management (ELM) Award.

In 2007, she received the Jean Hersholt Humanitarian Award for her work in cancer research at the 79th Academy Awards.

In 2011, Lansing pledged $5 million to University of Chicago Laboratory Schools to build a new arts wing, including a 250-seat performance venue.

, Lansing was a member of the board of directors of the Dole Food Company. Beginning in 2012, she has also served as a member of the board of directors for the W. M. Keck Foundation. In May 2018, Lansing joined the board of directors at The Scripps Research Institute.

In March 2020, she hosted a fundraiser for Joe Biden at her house.

Personal life 
Lansing married fellow student Michael Brownstein in 1967 while attending Northwestern University. They divorced in 1970. Since 1991, she has been married to director William Friedkin.

Lansing and former MGM studio head James T. Aubrey were struck by a car while crossing Wilshire Boulevard in the mid-1970s. Both were badly hurt and Lansing had to use crutches for a year and a half. Aubrey nursed her back to health. "He came every day. He would say, 'You're not going to limp.' My own mother and father couldn't have given me more support," she told Variety in 2004.

Filmography

Producer
Firstborn (1984)
When the Time Comes (1987) (TV)
Fatal Attraction (1987)
The Accused (1988)
Black Rain (1989)
School Ties (1992)
Indecent Proposal (1993)

Actress or herself
The Good Guys (1968) (TV)
Loving (1970)
Rio Lobo (1970)
Dan August (1971) (TV)
Ironside (1971) (TV)
Hollywood Women (1993) (TV)
Frasier (1996) (TV)
The Directors (1999) (TV)
Sunday Morning Shootout (2004) (TV)
Black Rain: Post-Production (2006)
Black Rain: Making the Film - Part 2 (2006)
Black Rain: The Script, the Cast (2006)
Black Rain: Making the Film - Part 1 (2006)
Coming Attractions: The History of the Movie Trailer (2006)
Boffo! Tinseltown's Bombs and Blockbusters (2006)Herself
... A Father... A Son... Once Upon a Time in Hollywood (2005) (TV)
The 79th Annual Academy Awards (2007) (TV)
The Jewish Americans (2008) (TV)
The Brothers Warner (2008)
Entertainment Tonight (2008)

Awards and recognition
2017: National Women's Hall of Fame Inductee
2008: CSHL Double Helix Medal Honoree
2007, Jean Hersholt Humanitarian Award, presented by Academy of Motion Picture Arts and Sciences
2007, Honorary Doctorate in Humane Letters from Pennsylvania State University
2006, American Association for Cancer Research Public Service Award
 2006, Business hero, The My Hero Project
2005, Big Brothers Big Sisters (L.A.) Legacy Award
2005, Exemplary Leadership in Management Award presented by UCLA Anderson School of Management
2005, hand and foot prints at Grauman's Chinese Theater
2004, Horatio Alger Humanitarian Award
2003, Woodrow Wilson Award for Corporate Citizenship
2003, Honorary Doctorate in Fine Arts from the American Film Institute
2002, President's Award, presented by Academy of Science Fiction, Fantasy & Horror Films
2000, Milestone Award presented by Producers Guild of America
1996, Overcoming Obstacles Achievement Award for Business, presented by Chicago Women in Film
1996, YWCA Silver Achievement Award
1996, Pioneer of the Year by the Foundation of the Motion Picture Pioneers
1996, Star on the walk of fame, presented by Hollywood Walk of Fame
1994, Outstanding Alumna Award presented by Sigma Delta Tau (ΣΔΤ) Sorority  
1994, Razzie for Indecent Proposal, presented by Razzie Awards
1993, Golden Plate Award of the American Academy of Achievement
1992, Simon Wiesenthal Center Distinguished Service Award for the Performing Arts
1989, Alfred P. Sloan, Jr. Memorial Award
1988, Oscar nomination for Fatal Attraction'', presented by Academy of Motion Picture Arts and Sciences
1982, Distinguished Community Service Award from Brandeis University
1981, Crystal Award, presented by Women in Film for outstanding women who, through their endurance and the excellence of their work, have helped to expand the role of women within the entertainment industry.
1980, Economic Equity Award from the Women's Equity Action League

References

External links

"Moviemaker Moves to Prime Time — of Life," Northwestern magazine
Distinguished American profile
Sherry Lansing Says Goodbye to Hollywood
UC Regent profile
The Sherry Lansing Foundation
Friends of Cancer Research

Film producers from California
American film studio executives
20th-century American Jews
American people of German-Jewish descent
American women in film
1944 births
Living people
Jewish American actresses
Northwestern University School of Communication alumni
Actresses from Chicago
University of California regents
University of Chicago Laboratory Schools alumni
Jean Hersholt Humanitarian Award winners
Businesspeople from Los Angeles
American women film producers
Jewish women in business
20th Century Studios people
Paramount Pictures executives
Film producers from Illinois
21st-century American Jews
Presidents of Paramount Pictures